is a city in Ishikari Subprefecture, Hokkaido, Japan.

History 
Ebetsu was settled originally by Japanese people in 1871, who came from the Miyagi Prefecture on Honshu. In 1878, tondenhei began moving into the area. When the Meiji Government, in 1878, designated Hokkaido as part of Japan, settlers began to flood the area. Ebetsu earned township status in 1916 and city status in 1954. During the 1960s and 1970s, a burgeoning population in Sapporo caused the population in Ebetsu to concurrently boom. In 1991, the city reached 100,000 people.

The name Ebetsu is derived from the Ainu name of the Chitose River which flows into the Ishikari River in the city. According to John Batchelor in his "An Ainu-English Dictionary" (chapter 1, section V: Place Names Considered) the Ainu language name was E-pet or "humour river" based on its murky colour.

Demographics 
As of May 1, 2017, the city has an estimated population of 119,086, with 56,325 households, and a population density of 630 persons per km². The total area is 187.57 km².

Geography and transportation 
The majority of commercial Ebetsu is on or immediately surrounding Route 12 (runs north-south through town).  The northern limits of town are delineated by the Ishikari River, the southern sub-city of Oasa by Ebetsu's boundary with Sapporo. It bounds the city limits of Kitahiroshima, Iwamizawa, Nanporo, Tōbetsu, and Shinshinotsu.

Ebetsu is about 16 km from downtown Sapporo. It is accessed by the Hokkaido Expressway, by Chūō or JR Hokkaidō bus lines, or by the Asahikawa-Hakodate train line that approximately follows Route 12 through town (at Oasa, Nopporo, Takasago, and Ebetsu stations), joining with the northwest-southeast running main line that extends from Chitose Airport to Sapporo Station in Shinsapporo (New Sapporo, a district of larger metropolitan Sapporo).

The extensive Nopporo Forest State Park (the world's largest park of virgin forest on level ground) is behind Ebetsu's Rakunō Gakuen University (the first university in Ebetsu, founded in 1949), encompassing 2015 hectares of preserved forest. Because of Ebetsu's location approximately in the middle of the Ishikari Plain (Sapporo city is the southwestern extent), it is known for having wind year-round.

Climate 
The 10-year average temperature for Ebetsu is 7.1 degrees Celsius.  The hottest and coldest temperatures, respectively, ever recorded are 34.5 °C and -27.7 °C.

Sister city and friendship city

Sister city
  Gresham, Oregon, United States (since 1977)

Friendship city
  Tosa, Kōchi, Japan (since 1978)

Education

Universities 
 Hokkaido Information University
 Rakunō Gakuen University
 Sapporo Gakuin University
 Hokushō University

High schools

Public
 Hokkaido Ebetsu High School
 Hokkaido Nopporo High School
 Hokkaido Ooasa High School

Private
 Ritsumeikan keisho High School
 Towanomori San-ai High School

Mascot 

He is a yellow flightless bird that resembled a young rooster who loves to be petted. His head is unusually square. Because of this, he is nicknamed . He may looked sad because of his tears (which is his charm point), he is actually happy. Whenever something wonderful happens (e.g. farmers working hard, witnessing children, falling leaves, etc.), he will shed tears for joy. He is known for carrying a grain ear. He likes locally grown wheat. When he was first revealed back in 2011, he was genderless. He is originally an unofficial mascot until it is chosen by the local tourism association to represent the city.

References

External links

Official Website 

 
Cities in Hokkaido